Tianyuan District is one of four urban districts of Zhuzhou City, Hunan province, China. The district was formed on May 31, 1997. Its name derives from Tian-tai Mountain and Yuan-yi Farm, which were two important places then, taking their first syllables, creating the name of Tianyuan District.

Located in the south western region of the city proper and on the southwestern shoreside of the Xiang River, the district is bordered across the Xiang river to the north by Yuetang District of Xiangtang and Shifeng District, to the northeast by Hetang and Lusong Districts, to the southeast and the south by Zhuzhou County, to the west by Xiangtan County. The district has 3 subdistricts and 3 towns under its jurisdiction. the government seat is at Liyu Subdistrict.

Administrative divisions
According to the result on adjustment of subdistrict divisions of Tianyuan District on November 26, 2015, Tianyuan District has 3 subdistricts and 3 towns under its jurisdiction. they are:

3 subdistricts
 Liyu
 Songshanlu
 Taishanlu

3 towns
 Leidashi
 Qunfeng
 Sanmen

References

 www.xzqh.org 

County-level divisions of Hunan
Zhuzhou